Kabir Alikhail (born 13 November 1996) is an Afghan cricketer. He made his List A debut for Mis Ainak Region in the 2017 Ghazi Amanullah Khan Regional One Day Tournament on 10 August 2017. He made his first-class debut for Mis Ainak Region in the 2017–18 Ahmad Shah Abdali 4-day Tournament on 20 October 2017.

References

External links
 

1996 births
Living people
Afghan cricketers
Mis Ainak Knights cricketers
People from Paktia Province